The 2009 Colgate Raiders football team was an American football team that represented Colgate University during the 2009 NCAA Division I FCS football season. Colgate tied for second in the Patriot League.

In its 14th season under head coach Dick Biddle, the team compiled a 9–2 record. Pat Simonds was the team captains. 

The Raiders outscored opponents 342 to 246. Colgate's 4–2 conference record placed it in a three-way tie with Lafayette and Lehigh for second in the Patriot League standings.

Despite tying for second place, Colgate had the best overall record among Patriot League teams, sweeping its non-league opponents. A seven-game win streak to start the season saw the team enter the weekly national rankings at No. 25 at the end of September, rising as high as No. 17 before settling at No. 21 in the final poll of the year. The Raiders did not qualify for the FCS playoffs.

Colgate played its home games at Andy Kerr Stadium in Hamilton, New York.

Schedule

References

Colgate
Colgate Raiders football seasons
Colgate Raiders football